Westensee is a municipality in the district of Rendsburg-Eckernförde, in Schleswig-Holstein, Germany.

The location of Westensee is south of the municipality of Bredenbek or Felde, but north of Emkendorf or Langwedel, and west of Schierensee.

References

Municipalities in Schleswig-Holstein
Rendsburg-Eckernförde